The FIBA EuroBasket Women 2010 Division C was the 11th edition of the lowest tier of the women's European basketball championship, which is today known as FIBA Women's European Championship for Small Countries. The tournament took place in Yerevan, Armenia, from 28 June to 3 July 2010. Malta women's national basketball team won the tournament for the second time.

Participating teams

First round
In the first round, the teams were drawn into two groups. The first two teams from each group advance to the semifinals, the other teams will play in the 5th–7th place classification.

Group A

Group B

5th–7th place classification

Group C

Playoffs

Semifinals

3rd place match

Final

Final standings

References

FIBA Women's European Championship for Small Countries
EuroBasket Women 2010 Division C
International sports competitions hosted by Armenia
Basketball in Armenia
2010 in Armenian sport
June 2010 sports events in Europe
July 2010 sports events in Europe